The 1930 Louisiana Tech Bulldogs football team was an American football team that represented the Louisiana Polytechnic Institute (now known as Louisiana Tech University) as a member of the Southern Intercollegiate Athletic Association (SIAA) during the 1930 college football season. In their first year under head coach George Bohler, the team compiled a 3–6 record.

Schedule

References

Louisiana Tech
Louisiana Tech Bulldogs football seasons
Louisiana Tech Bulldogs football